Daphnella itonis is a species of sea snail, a marine gastropod mollusc in the family Raphitomidae.

Description

Distribution
This marine species occurs off New Caledonia, the Philippines and Japan.

References

 Sysoev, A.; Bouchet, P. (2001). Gastéropodes turriformes (Gastropoda: Conoidea) nouveaux ou peu connus du Sud-Ouest Pacifique = New and uncommon turriform gastropods (Gastropoda: Conoidea) from the South-West Pacific. in: Bouchet, P. et al. (Ed.) Tropical deep-sea benthos. Mémoires du Muséum national d'Histoire naturelle. Série A, Zoologie. 185: 271–320
 Liu J.Y. [Ruiyu] (ed.). (2008). Checklist of marine biota of China seas. China Science Press. 1267 pp.

External links
 Bouchet, Philippe & Virginie, Heros & Lozouet, Pierre & Maestrati, Philippe. A quarter-century of deep-sea malacological exploration in the South and West Pacific: Where do we stand? How far to go?." Tropical deep-sea Benthos 25 (2008): 9–40
 MNHN, Paris: holotype
 Gastropods.com: Daphnella itonis
 

itonis
Gastropods described in 2001